The Cameroon national baseball team is the national baseball team of Cameroon. They are currently the 6th team in Africa and the 74th-ranked men's baseball team in the IBAF World Rankings.

The team is controlled by the Cameroon Baseball & Softball Federation, which is represented in the African Baseball & Softball Association.

References

National baseball teams in Africa
baseball